Merkle and Merckle are surnames of German origin. It used to be the minimization of a variety of Old German given names such as Markwart (meaning "guard of the frontier") or Markhard (meaning "strong frontier"). They may refer to:

Cryptography and computing
 Merkle–Damgård construction, a method of building collision-resistant cryptographic hash functions
 Merkle–Hellman knapsack cryptosystem, an early public key cryptosystem
 Merkle's Puzzles, an early construction for a public-key cryptosystem
 Merkle tree, a computer hash tree

People

Business
 Adolf Merckle (19342009), German entrepreneur
 Edgar A. Merkle, (1900-1984), American founder of Merkle Press in Washington, D.C. and Merkle Wildlife Sanctuary and Visitor's Center on the Patuxent River in Maryland
  (19132000), German industrial manager and 1996 winner of the Adenauer-de Gaulle Prize
 Ludwig Merckle (born 1965), German businessman
 Philipp Daniel Merckle (born 1966), German entrepreneur

Religion
 Benjamin L. Merkle, professor at Southeastern Baptist Theological Seminary, North Carolina 
 Benjamin R. Merkle, president of New Saint Andrews College, Idaho

Sport
 Andreas Merkle (born 1962), former German footballer 
 Ed Merkle (191787), American football player
 Fred Merkle (18881956), American baseball player
  (1918–1993), German football trainer and coach of 1. FC Köln

Other people
 Judith Merkle Riley (19422010), American writer, teacher and academic
 Marcel-André Casasola Merkle (born 1977), German game designer
 Ralph Merkle (born 1952), American computer scientist, public key cryptography pioneer, and nanotechnology advocate

Other uses
 Merkle Wildlife Sanctuary and Visitor's Center, Maryland, United States 
 Merkle's Boner, a baserunning mistake in baseball

See also
 Merkel (surname)
 Merkel (disambiguation)
 
 

Surnames of German origin
Surnames from given names